Robert Cushman (1578–1625) was an important leader and organiser of the Mayflower voyage in 1620.

Robert Cushman may also refer to:

 Robert Cushman (curator) (1946–2009), photography curator
 Robert E. Cushman Jr. (1914–1985), U.S. Marine Corps general
 Robert H. Cushman (1924–1996), engineering journalist
 R. A. Cushman (Robert Asa Cushman, 1880–1957), American entomologist

See also 
 Cushman (disambiguation)
 Cushman (name), list